Slaven is a masculine Slavic given name.
Cognates include Slavko. Czech feminine form is Slavena.

Notable people with the name include:
 Slaven Bačić, Serbian Croat lawyer
 Slaven Bilić, Croatian football manager and former football player
 Slaven Čupković, Serbian football player
 Slaven Dizdarević, Slovak decathlete of Bosnian origin
 Slaven Došlo, Serbian actor
 Slaven Kovačević, Montenegrin football player
 Slaven Krajačić, Croatian athlete
 Slaven Letica, Croatian writer
 Slaven Musa, Bosnian Croat football player
 Slaven Rimac, Croatian basketball player
 Slaven Stanković, Serbian football player
 Slaven Stjepanović, Montenegrin football player
 Slaven Tolj, Croatian artist
 Slaven Zambata, Croatian football player
 Slaven Žužul, Croatian football functionary

See also 
 Slaven (surname)
 Slavens

Croatian masculine given names
Serbian masculine given names
Montenegrin masculine given names